Hawker Aircraft Limited was a British aircraft manufacturer that was responsible for some of the most famous products in British aviation history.

History

Hawker had its roots in the aftermath of the First World War, which resulted in the bankruptcy of the Sopwith Aviation Company. Sopwith test pilot Harry Hawker and three others, including Thomas Sopwith, bought the assets of Sopwith and formed H.G. Hawker Engineering in 1920.

In 1933, the company was renamed Hawker Aircraft Limited, and it took advantage of the Great Depression and a strong financial position to purchase the Gloster Aircraft Company in 1934. The next year, it merged with the engine and automotive company Armstrong Siddeley and its subsidiary, Armstrong Whitworth Aircraft, to form Hawker Siddeley Aircraft. This group also encompassed A. V. Roe and Company (Avro).

The company continued to produce designs under the "Hawker" name as part of Hawker Siddeley Aircraft, which from 1955 was a division of Hawker Siddeley Group. In 1963, the "Hawker" brand name was dropped, along with those of the sister companies; the Hawker P.1127 was the last aircraft to carry the brand name.

The Hawker legacy was maintained by the American company Raytheon, which produced business jets (including some derived from the 125, whose original design dated back to de Havilland days) under the "Hawker" name. This was the result of purchasing British Aerospace's product line in 1993. The name was also used by Hawker Beechcraft after Raytheon's business jet interests (Hawker and Beechcraft) were acquired by investors and merged.

Products

The first Hawker design was the unbuilt Hawker Humpback of December 1920. This was soon followed by the Hawker Duiker, the first prototype, which flew in July 1923. In the interwar years, Hawker produced a successful line of bombers and fighters for the Royal Air Force, the product of Sydney Camm (later Sir Sydney) and his team. These included the Hawker Hind and the Hawker Hart, which became the most produced UK aeroplane in the years before the Second World War.

During the Second World War, the Hawker Siddeley company was one of the United Kingdom's most important aviation concerns, producing numerous designs including the famous Hawker Hurricane fighter plane that, along with the Supermarine Spitfire, was instrumental in winning the Battle of Britain. During the battle, Hawker Hurricanes in service outnumbered all other British fighters combined, and were responsible for shooting down 55 percent of all enemy aircraft destroyed.

List
Hawker Duiker 1923  prototype – first original design by Hawker, 1 aircraft built, J6918
Hawker Woodcock 1923
Hawker Cygnet 1924
Hawker Hedgehog 1924 prototype
Hawker Horsley 1925
Hawker Heron 1925
Hawker Hornbill 1925
Hawker Danecock 1925
Hawker Harrier 1927 prototype
Hawker Hawfinch 1927
Hawker Hart 1928
Operators of Hawker Hart and variants
Hawker F.20/27 1928 prototype
Hawker Hoopoe 1928
Hawker Tomtit 1928
Hawker Hornet 1929
Hawker Osprey 1929
Hawker Nimrod 1930
Hawker Fury 1931
Hawker Fury variants
Hawker Audax 1931
Hawker Dantorp 1932
Hawker Demon 1933
Hawker P.V.3 1934 prototype
Hawker Hart 1934
Hawker Hind 1934
Hawker Hind variants
Hawker P.V.4 1934 prototype
Hawker Hartbeest 1935
Hawker Hurricane 1935
Hawker Sea Hurricane
Hawker Hurricane variants
List of Hawker Hurricane operators
List of surviving Hawker Hurricanes
Hawker Hector 1936
Hawker Henley 1937
Hawker Hotspur 1938
Hawker Tornado 1939
Hawker Typhoon 1940
List of Hawker Typhoon operators
Hawker Tempest 1942
List of Hawker Tempest operators
Hawker F.2/43 Fury 1943 prototype
Hawker Sea Fury 1944
List of Hawker Sea Fury operators
Hawker P.1040 1947 prototype
Hawker Sea Hawk 1947
List of Hawker Sea Hawk operators
Hawker P.1052 1948 prototype
Hawker P.1072 1950 prototype
Hawker P.1078 prototype
Hawker P.1081 1950 prototype
Hawker Hunter 1951
Hawker Hunter variants
List of Hawker Hunter operators
Hawker Hunter in service with Swiss Air Force
Hawker P.1127 1960 prototype

Projects
Source: Hannah (1982)

Hawker P.1000
Hawker P.1004
Hawker P.1005 - high speed unarmed bomber, to be powered by two Napier Sabre engines, to Specification B11/41
Hawker P.1007
Hawker P.1008
Hawker P.1014
Hawker P.1017
Hawker P.1021
Hawker P.1025
Hawker P.1027
Hawker P.1028
Hawker P.1029
Hawker P.1030
Hawker P.1031
Hawker P.1037
Hawker P.1041
Hawker P.1044
Hawker P.1048
Hawker P.1049
Hawker P.1050
Hawker P.1051
Hawker P.1053
Hawker P.1054
Hawker P.1055
Hawker P.1056
Hawker P.1057
Hawker P.1058
Hawker P.1063
Hawker P.1064
Hawker P.1065
Hawker P.1069
Hawker P.1070
Hawker P.1071
Hawker P.1073
Hawker P.1077
Hawker P.1079
Hawker P.1082
Hawker P.1084
Hawker P.1085
Hawker P.1088
Hawker P.1089
Hawker P.1092
Hawker P.1093
Hawker P.1096
Hawker P.1098
Hawker P.1103 1950s interceptor project
Hawker P.1104
Hawker P.1106
Hawker P.1107
Hawker P.1108
Hawker P.1121 late 1950s fighter project
Hawker P.1124
Hawker P.1125
Hawker P.1126
Hawker P.1128
Hawker P.1129
Hawker P.1131
Hawker P.1132
Hawker P.1134
Hawker P.1136
Hawker P.1137
Hawker P.1139
Hawker P.1141
Hawker P.1143
Hawker P.1149
Hawker P.1152
Hawker P.1214

Key people

 Harry Hawker
 Thomas Sopwith

Aircraft designers and engineers
 Sydney Camm
 Roy Chaplin
 Robert Lickley
 Richard Walker

Chief Test Pilots
 George Bulman
 Bill Humble
 Wimpy Wade
 Neville Duke
 Alfred William (Bill) Bedford

See also
 Aerospace industry in the United Kingdom

References

Citations

Bibliography

 
.

.

External links

 Hawker – British Aircraft Directory

Defunct aircraft manufacturers of the United Kingdom
Hawker Siddeley
Vehicle manufacturing companies established in 1920
Manufacturing companies based in London
History of the Royal Borough of Kingston upon Thames
1920 establishments in England
Vehicle manufacturing companies disestablished in 1963
1963 disestablishments in England
British companies disestablished in 1963
British companies established in 1920